Northern Expedition or Northern Expeditions can refer to:

In history

In Chinese history (北伐)
Zhuge Liang's Northern Expeditions (228-234), a military campaign led by Zhuge Liang in the Three Kingdoms period
Jiang Wei's Northern Expeditions (247-262), a military campaign led by Jiang Wei in the Three Kingdoms period
Huan Wen's Northern Expeditions (354-369), a military campaign led by Huan Wen in the Jin dynasty and Sixteen Kingdoms period
Liu Yu's Northern Expeditions (409-416), a military campaign led by Liu Yu in the Jin dynasty and Sixteen Kingdoms period
Northern Expedition (Taiping Rebellion), a military campaign led by the Taiping against the Qing during the Taiping Rebellion
Northern Expedition, a military campaign led by the Kuomintang

In Russian history
Great Northern Expedition, the Russian Empire's exploration of its arctic territories

In Thai history
Burmese–Siamese War (1849–1855), a military campaign led by the Siamese against the Konbaung dynasty
Burma campaign, a military campaign led by the Thailand against the British empire

In transportation
MV Northern Expedition, a ferry operating in northern British Columbia